Ronnie Whelan Sr. (17 November 1936 – 16 July 1993)  was a Republic of Ireland international footballer, who played for several clubs, most notably St. Patrick's Athletic. He is the father of Ronnie Whelan Jr. Another son, Paul, and a grandson, Gavin, were also League of Ireland players. Whelan died in July 1993 at the age of 56 from stomach cancer.

Playing career

Clubs
Two fellow Ireland internationals played a role in the development of Whelan's early career. Legend has it, Whelan was initially "discovered" by the wife of Paddy Moore, who then recommended him to her husband who was coaching Stella Maris at the time. Later Whelan was invited by his neighbour, Liam Whelan, to join him at Home Farm. After an unsuccessful trial with Chelsea, Whelan signed for St. Patricks Athletic. Between 1957 and 1964 he was a prominent member of the St. Pat's forward line and was the club's leading goalscorer in five out of twelve seasons, scoring a total of 89 goals. During this time he helped St. Pat's win the 1958–59 and 1960–61 FAI Cup finals and the 1959–60 League of Ireland Shield. A run of injuries, effectively ended his St. Pat's career but he subsequently joined Drogheda for a further six seasons, helping them reach the 1970–71 FAI Cup final. While with Drogheda, Whelan also scored a further 20 league goals. He later played for Córas Iompair Éireann (CIÉ) in the League of Ireland B Division and then Aer Lingus of the Leinster Senior League. Whelan also worked for Aer Lingus.

Representative career

Republic of Ireland
In the 1963–64 season Whelan made two full appearances for the Republic of Ireland. On 25 September 1963 Whelan played in a European Nations Cup qualifier against Austria. The game finished 0–0. On 24 May 1964 Whelan came on as a substitute after just five minutes for an injured Joe Haverty in a friendly against England at Dalymount Park. Ireland lost this game 3–1.

League of Ireland XI
Whelan played for the League of Ireland XI on at least two occasions. On 17 March 1961 he played against an Irish League XI. On 2 October 1963 at Dalymount Park, Whelan scored the winner for the League of Ireland XI in a 2–1 win against an English League XI. This English League XI included four players – Ray Wilson, Bobby Moore, Roger Hunt and Martin Peters – who subsequently went on to help England win the 1966 FIFA World Cup. At the time Whelan was working for Unidare, a Finglas-based electrical firm. Whelan subsequently received a warning from his boss at Unidare for taking time off to play in this game.

Dublin XI
In 1964 Whelan played for a Dublin XI against Liverpool.

Honours

St. Patricks Athletic
FAI Cup
Winners: 1958–59, 1960–61
League of Ireland Shield
1959–60

Drogheda
FAI Cup
Runners-up: 1970–71

References

1936 births
1993 deaths
Republic of Ireland association footballers
Republic of Ireland international footballers
Association football forwards
Stella Maris F.C. players
Home Farm F.C. players
St Patrick's Athletic F.C. players
Drogheda United F.C. players
League of Ireland players
League of Ireland XI players
Shamrock Rovers F.C. guest players
Deaths from stomach cancer
Association footballers from County Dublin
Leinster Senior League (association football) players
Deaths from cancer in the Republic of Ireland